Monumentale is a station on Line 5 of the Milan Metro.

History 
The works for the construction of the station began in 2010, as part of the second section of the line, from Garibaldi FS to San Siro Stadio. The station was opened on 11 October 2015.

Monumentale is one of the stations where a tunnel boring machine was used to build the galleries.

Station structure 
Monumentale is an underground station with two tracks served by two side platforms and, like all the other stations on Line 5, is wheelchair accessible.

Interchanges 
Near this station are located:
  Tram stops (lines 2, 4, 10, 12, 14 and 33)

References

Line 5 (Milan Metro) stations
Railway stations opened in 2015
2015 establishments in Italy
Railway stations in Italy opened in the 21st century